The Gulf Coast Conference (GCC) was a short-lived NCAA college athletic conference composed of universities in the U.S. state of Texas from 1949 until 1957.  The charter members of the conference were University of Houston, Midwestern University (now Midwestern State University), North Texas State College (now the University of North Texas), and Trinity University.  The Gulf Coast Conference spawned from then members of the Lone Star Conference, and its president was D.L. Ligon.  In 1956, when the NCAA created divisions, all members of the conference at the time were classified as part of the NCAA's College Division, which was later subdivided into Division II and Division III in 1973.  Charter member Houston had already left for the Missouri Valley Conference by the end of 1950, and was classified as a University Division school, which later became known as Division I.

Members
Abilene Christian 1954–1957 (1954 basketball only)
Hardin-Simmons 1956–1957 (basketball only)
Houston 1949–1950
Midwestern State 1949–1957
North Texas 1949–1957
Trinity 1949–1957

Membership timeline

Current conference affiliations
 Abilene Christian - Western Athletic Conference (Division I FCS)
 Hardin-Simmons - American Southwest Conference (Division III)
 Houston - American Athletic Conference (Division I FBS)
 Midwestern State - Lone Star Conference (Division II)
 North Texas - Conference USA (Division I FBS)
 Trinity - Southern Collegiate Athletic Conference (Division III)

Conference championships

Baseball

Football

Men's basketball

References

 
1949 establishments in Texas
1957 disestablishments in Texas